Somewhere Else may refer to:

Albums 
 Somewhere Else (Lydia Loveless album), 2014
 Somewhere Else (Eva Avila album), 2006
 Somewhere Else (Marillion album), 2007
 Somewhere Else (Sun Ra album), 1993
 Somewhere Else (Barry Altschul album), 1979
 Somewhere Else (Sally Shapiro album), 2013

Songs 
 "Somewhere Else", a 1997 song by China Drum
 "Somewhere Else", a 2003 song by rock band Travis from their album 12 Memories
 "Somewhere Else" (Razorlight song), a 2005 song by Razorlight from their debut album Up All Night
 "Somewhere Else", a 2008 song by VenetianPrincess
 "Somewhere Else" (Toby Keith song), the third and final single by Toby Keith from his 2010 album Bullets in the Gun, released in 2011

Other uses 
 "Somewhere Else" (The Good Place), an episode of the American comedy television series

See also
 Elsewhere (disambiguation)